Luminița Anghel (born 7 October 1968) is a Romanian singer, TV personality and politician. She is internationally known for representing Romania at the Eurovision Song Contest 2005 along with percussion band Sistem. Their song, "Let Me Try", reached the third place in the final after placing first in the semi-finals; their appearance marks the country's best result in the contest along with 2010's "Playing with Fire" performed by Paula Seling and Ovi.

Anghel particularly experienced success in her native country with follow-up recordings, resulting her receiving an offer from Walt Disney Pictures to provide vocals for Tangled's Mother Gothel in 2010. The singer won numerous awards, including distinctions from Bulgaria and Malta.

Early life and early career 
Luminița Anghel was born on 7 October 1968 in Bucharest, Romania. She is a graduate of the Popular Art School, where she attended the vocal-light music section and the Faculty of Sociology and Psychology within the university Spiru Haret. She loved performing during childhood, having performed from the age of 8. Since then, her artistic career has gone from strength to strength. These days, Anghel is a very popular and appreciated artist, and has been awarded with numerous prizes, both in domestic and international song contests. As a teenager, she began working with Ensemble "Doina". Along with this assembly she had a series of tournaments in her native country and abroad.

Anghel became known in Romania in 1993, when she won the first prize and the trophy at the Mamaia Music Festival, and 1995 she won the third prize at the same contest. Also in 1995, she starred in the film Captain Conan, directed by Bertrard Tavernier. In 2001, she won the first prize for the best performance, and the popularity-price at the International Festival The Golden Stag in Romania. One year later she came first at the Maltese Festival Song For Europe. Anghel was there awarded with the first prize and the trophy for the best international voice. Another trophies came for her few months later at the International festival Discovery, in Bulgaria, and the Universetalent. In 2003, she won the first prize for the best international performance at the International Festival Voice of Asia, the second prize at the International Creation Festival in Cairo 2003, with her own and first song  I Ask You Why. Luminița is also a well-known and appreciated TV host for different programmes (mostly) on public television. She was a host at the channels TVR1, TVR2, TVRi and Antena 1.

From 2002 to 2009, she was a private party planner for events on ENTERTAINMENT INTL S.R.L. In 2008, she was chosen to be the image of Garnier in Romania for skin care. The claim was later forbidden by the Romanian CNA. Politicians, who candidate for something, cannot appear on the television.

Her single "Love Will Come" peaked at number 5 in Romania.

Awards and nominations

Filmography

Television

Film

 A Poem is... - Narrator - The Mother Song (Romanian version) from Disney Junior block program

Private life
Luminița Anghel married her partner, Silviu Dumitriade, in a private civil ceremony, in the Mangalia beach, in Romania, in October 2011. The couple remarried each other, this time in a Christian Orthodox religious ceremony in Spain at 20 March 2012.

Eurovision Song Contest
Luminița Anghel, along with Tony Tomas and Adrian Piper participated in Selecția Națională 2010 on 6 March 2010. They presented their song "Save Their Lives" in a bid to represent Romania at the 2010 Eurovision Song Contest. In 2013, Anghel attempted to represent Romania, entering Selecția Națională with the song "Unique." Her song placed third overall.

Political career
At the 2008 Romanian legislative election, she was a Social Democratic candidate for a Bucharest seat in the Chamber of Deputies; she lost to Elena Udrea.

Discography

Albums

Singles

References

External links
Official site
Biography at Eurovision.tv site
Interview @ Radio Lynx Romania 

1968 births
Living people
21st-century Romanian singers
21st-century Romanian women singers
Members of the Romanian Orthodox Church
Eurovision Song Contest entrants for Romania
Eurovision Song Contest entrants of 2005
Romanian women pop singers
21st-century Romanian women politicians
21st-century Romanian politicians
English-language singers from Romania
Social Democratic Party (Romania) politicians